Daiana Serafim da Silva (born 20 October 1992), known as Day Silva, is a Brazilian professional footballer who plays as a central defender for Palmeiras and the Brazil women's national team.

Club career
Born in Varginha, Minas Gerais, Day Silva played for amateur sides in her hometown before making her senior debut with Atlético Mineiro in 2010. She subsequently played for Duque de Caxias and Botafogo before joining Flamengo in 2015.

In January 2020, Day Silva moved to Santos. She spent a part of the 2021 campaign sidelined after being diagnosed with chikungunya, and left the club in December.

In January 2022, Day Silva joined Palmeiras.

Honours
Atlético Mineiro
Campeonato Mineiro de Futebol Feminino: 2010

Flamengo
Campeonato Carioca de Futebol Feminino: 2015, 2016, 2017, 2018, 2019
Campeonato Brasileiro de Futebol Feminino Série A1: 2016

Santos
Copa Paulista de Futebol Feminino: 2020

References

1992 births
Living people
People from Varginha, Minas Gerais
Brazilian women's footballers
Women's association football defenders
Campeonato Brasileiro de Futebol Feminino Série A1 players
Santos FC (women) players
Sociedade Esportiva Palmeiras (women) players
Sportspeople from Minas Gerais
Clube de Regatas do Flamengo (women) players
Clube Atlético Mineiro (women) players